This is a partial list of molecules that contain 19 carbon atoms.

See also
 Carbon number
 List of compounds with carbon number 18
 List of compounds with carbon number 20

C19